{{Infobox baseball team |
| Name		= Caimanes BBC
| Logo                = Caimanes_de_Barranquilla_logo.png
| Location			= Barranquilla, Colombia
| League			= Colombian Professional Baseball League
| LeagueChamps= ''12 (1984-85, 1993-94, 1997-98, 1998-99, 2007-08, 2008-09, 2009-10, 2012-13, 2015-16, 2018-19, 2020-21, 2021-22)
| series           = Caribbean Series
| series_champs    = 2022
| Founded = 1984
| Stadium		= Estadio Édgar Rentería
| President		=  Jimmy Char 
| Manager		=  José Mosquera
| Colors              = Blue, White, Red  
| Website= http://www.caimanesbbc.com/
| h_cap=0066FF|h_pattern_cap=
| h_body=0066FF|h_pattern_b=
| h_leftarm=0066FF|h_pattern_la=
| h_rightarm=0066FF|h_pattern_ra=
| h_pants=FFFFFF|h_pattern_pants=
| h_socks=0066FF
| a_cap=FFFFFF|a_pattern_cap=
| a_body=FFFFFF|a_pattern_b=
| a_leftarm=FFFFFF|a_pattern_la=
| a_rightarm=FFFFFF|a_pattern_ra=
| a_pants=FFFFFF|a_pattern_pants=
| a_socks=FFFFFF
}}

The Caimanes de Barranquilla''' are a baseball team in the Colombian Professional Baseball League.  They have participated in the league since the 1984–1985 season, playing in the 12,000-capacity Estadio Édgar Rentería in Barranquilla. The Caimanes are the most successful team in Colombian baseball, having won 12 league titles, including the 2021–22 season. They also won the Caribbean Series in 2022, making Colombia the first new country to win the Caribbean Series since Mexico's Naranjeros de Hermosillo won their first title in 1976.

History 
In 1998 the success of Colombian-born players in Major League Baseball, most notably Édgar Rentería (who was on the 1997 World Champion Florida Marlins), led to a meeting in Miami of Colombian baseball personalities including Edinson Rentería, Edgar Perez and José Martínez (who led and contributed to the development of Colombian Professional Baseball between 1979 and 1985).  The meeting was acknowledged by the MLB and the Caribbean Confederation of Professional Baseball.  The meeting established a working group consisting of the businessmen involved with professional baseball in Colombia in the 1980s and new executives from the cities of Barranquilla and Cartagena including Alfredo Navarro, Farid Char, Gabriel Pelaez, Iveth Chejuan, Tico Bernal, and Julio Blanch.  This working group was presented with a proposal to revive professional baseball in Colombia under the leadership of the Rentería family. The working group decided to move forward with the proposal, beginning the 1999–2000 season with four teams, the Caimanes y Electricos de Barranquilla (The Barranquilla Alligators and Electric Eels) and the Tigres e Indios of Cartagena (The Cartagena Tigers and Indians).

2022 Caribbean Series roster

References

Baseball teams in Colombia